Madhab Chandra Das College, or M.C.D. College or M.C.Das College or Sonai College, was founded by Alhaj Tajamul Ali Mazumdar (or T. A. Mazumdar or Potol Mazumdar), in 1972.  It is situated in Sonai Constituency or the Sonai sub-division, a rural area in the Cachar district of Assam, India. The first piece of land was donated by a local landowner after much persuasion by the founder. It was donated on condition that the college be named after the donor. The college was first affiliated to Gauhati University but is now affiliated to Assam University.  It has Arts apart from Science and Commerce degree courses. It has acquired B grades from NAAC in two assessments....

Principals 
 T. A.Mazumdar M.A. (Political Science)  (1972–2009). He has been given the Sahidul Alom Choudhury Memorial Award in Dispur.
 Mohan Singha M.A. (Economics) (i/c)
 Dr. (Ms.) Nirupama Nath M.A., (Bengali) Ph.D. (i/c)
 Sabir Ahmed Choudhury M.A. (English) (i/c)
 Dr. Baharul Islam Laskar M.A. (Economics), Ph.D., NET, (2012– )

The college is 16 km away from Silchar town.  It received 2(f) 12(b) status from UGC.  Most of the students belong either to SC Hindu section or are Muslims.  Many of them are Manipuris.
The college is still under the supervision and guidance of its founder principal Md. T. A. Mazumdar who is also the GB President.

Assets of the college:

The college has a growing central library with department libraries.

There is a canteen for both students and staff.

There is proper alternative electricity provision at times of loadshedding as the area is prone to frequent power outages.

External links

Universities and colleges in Assam
Colleges affiliated to Assam University
Educational institutions established in 1972
1972 establishments in Assam
Cachar district